Stockley is a small village  south of Calne in Wiltshire, England.

No settlements were recorded in Domesday Book, and the area was part of the king's large Calne estate. Stockley, together with Stock to the north, anciently formed a triangle of farmland to the south of Calne town; Stockley's southern boundary was the Roman road, and the boundary with Stock is uncertain. The Wiltshire Victoria County History recounts the history of the farmsteads, most of which were along the roads at the edges of the triangle. From 1763 some of the farms were part of the Bowood estate; most of that part was sold by the Marquess of Lansdowne in 2001.

Two farms lent their names to present-day hamlets: Broad's Green and Mile Elm.

The village is within the civil parish of Calne Without. Wiltshire Council is the unitary authority, which is responsible for all significant local government functions.

In 1841 a Primitive Methodist chapel was built at Stockley. It closed in 1966 and has since been demolished.

Stockley was transferred from Calne ecclesiastical parish to Heddington in 1887; today the parish is part of the Oldbury grouping.

References

External links

Calne Without
Villages in Wiltshire